Lesley Lebkowicz (born 1946) is an Australian poet.

Lesley Lebkowicz is a Canberra-based writer of poetry and prose. She recently won the 2013 ACT poetry prize, and is currently working on an essay detailing her temporary ordination as a Buddhist nun. Each year, she spends several months in Nepal, and is the current leader of the Canberra Insight Meditation Group.

Her work has appeared on buses and is featured in the paving of Canberra city as part of a public art program. She was shortlisted for the David Campbell award for poetry in 2006, and went on to win it in 2007. Lesley was one of a hundred notable Canberra writers included in the launch of the ACT Writers Showcase in 2012 to celebrate the centenary of Canberra 

Her book The Petrov Poems (2013), about Vladimir Petrov, was reviewed in the Sydney Morning Herald, about a "harrowing previous life in Russia" which is "sketched with terse effect." The Bma magazine said it "turns history from dry events into ones as well-fleshed out" The Rochford Street Review said "is an accomplished achievement, in which her detailed historical research, and her poetic and narrative skills blend to create a compelling evocation of a dramatic and significant period in post-war Australian political history."  The book was shortlisted for the 2014 ACT Book of the Year Award and won the 2014 ACT Writing and Publishing Awards: Poetry Book Category.

Bibliography

Essays and reporting

References

1946 births
Living people
Australian poets
Writers from Canberra
Buddhist nuns